This is not the 1916 George W. Lederer film by the same name.

The Decoy is a 1916 American black and white silent short drama film directed by William Garwood, and starring William Garwood, Edward Brady, Lois Wilson, Wadsworth Harris, and Frank MacQuarrie. The film premiered October 19, 1916. The film is said to be a story of "revenge and intrigue" with its scenes set in Paris according to the Moving Picture Exhibitors' Association writing about the film in 1916.

Cast
William Garwood – Raymond Everard
Edward Brady – Morat
Lois Wilson – Raymond's Mother
Wadsworth Harris -Raymond's Father
Frank MacQuarrie
 Jack Connolly

References

External links

1916 drama films
1916 films
Silent American drama films
American silent short films
American black-and-white films
1916 short films
1910s American films